Randy Kehler (born 1944 in Bronxville, New York) is an American pacifist activist and advocate for social justice. Kehler objected to America's involvement in the Vietnam war and refused to cooperate with the draft. He was involved in several anti-war organizations in the 1960s and 1970s.

In 1969, during the Vietnam War, Kehler returned his draft card to the Selective Service System. He refused to seek exemption as a conscientious objector, because he felt that was simply a form of cooperation with the US government's actions in Vietnam. After being called for induction and refusing to submit, he was charged with a federal crime. Found guilty at trial, Kehler served twenty-two months of a two-year sentence.

Daniel Ellsberg's exposure to Kehler in August 1969 (as Kehler was preparing to submit to his sentence) at the 13th Triennial Meeting of the War Resisters International, held at Haverford College, was a pivotal event in Ellsberg's decision to copy and release the Pentagon Papers. (It was Ellsberg's release of the Pentagon Papers which led President Nixon to create a group of in-house spies, who undertook the ill-fated Watergate break-in, which led to Nixon's resignation).

The refusal of Randy and his wife Betsy Corner since 1977 to pay taxes for military expenditures resulted in the 1989 Federal seizure, and eventual legal forfeiture, of their house in Colrain, Massachusetts. This was documented in the film An Act of Conscience (1997).

In the 1980s, Kehler served as Executive Director of the National Nuclear Weapons Freeze Campaign.

References

1944 births
Living people
American pacifists
American conscientious objectors
American tax resisters
People from Bronxville, New York
War Resisters League activists